Bawa Duka is a 1997 Sri Lankan drama film directed by Dharmasiri Bandaranayake and co-produced by Ven. Vijayapura Pagngnananna Thero and Jayaratne Wadduwage for Samadhi Films. It stars Swarna Mallawarachchi, W. Jayasiri and Jackson Anthony in lead roles along with Ravindra Randeniya and Hemasiri Liyanage. Music composed by Gunadasa Kapuge. It is the 877th Sri Lankan film in the Sinhala cinema. This film has a sequel, Bawa Karma.

Plot
The film is set in 1905 during the British colonial reign in Sri Lanka. Nona Hami is raped by Muhandiram. Peduru Appu marries her without knowing that she is pregnant with Muhandiram's child. The whole village learns about it but Peduru accepts her as his wife irrespective of her state. Many years pass and they have more kids. Nona Hami and Peduru always fight over the eldest child, Giran, who is Muhandiram's child. Giran is forced to jump into the river to escape his father's beatings.

Cast
 Swarna Mallawarachchi as Nona Hami 
 Jackson Anthony as Peduru 
 W. Jayasiri as Officer
 Hemasiri Liyanage as Nona Hami's father 
 Ravindra Randeniya as Muhandiram 
 Somy Rathnayake as Arachchi 
 Lalitha Sarachchandra as Nona Hami's mother 
 Suvineetha Weerasinghe as Arachchi hamine
 Ravindra Yasas as Puramipiya
 Nilmini Buwaneka
 Miyuri Samarasinghe as Peduru's mother

References

External links
 

1997 films
1990s Sinhala-language films
1997 drama films
Sri Lankan drama films